Rafiatu Folashade Lawal (born 12 November 1996) is a Nigerian weightlifter. She won the gold medal in the women's 59 kg event at the 2022 Commonwealth Games held in Birmingham, England. In 2019, she represented Nigeria at the African Games held in Rabat, Morocco and she won the gold medal in the women's 59kg event. She also won the gold medal in her event at the 2021 African Weightlifting Championships held in Nairobi, Kenya.

Career 

At the 2019 African Games held in Rabat, Morocco, she won the gold medal in the women's 59kg event. She also won the gold medal in both the Snatch and Clean & Jerk events. She also set a new African record of 93 kg in the Snatch event.

She competed in the women's 59kg event at the 2021 World Weightlifting Championships held in Tashkent, Uzbekistan. She finished in 6th place in this competition. The 2021 Commonwealth Weightlifting Championships were also held at the same time and her total result gave her the gold medal in this event. As a result, she qualified to compete at the 2022 Commonwealth Games in Birmingham, England.

She won the gold medal in the women's 59 kg event at the 2022 Commonwealth Games held in Birmingham, England. She also set new Commonwealth Games records in the Snatch (90 kg), Clean & Jerk (116 kg) and Total (206 kg).

Achievements

References

External links 

Living people
1996 births
Place of birth missing (living people)
Nigerian female weightlifters
African Games medalists in weightlifting
African Games gold medalists for Nigeria
Competitors at the 2019 African Games
African Weightlifting Championships medalists
Commonwealth Games medallists in weightlifting
Commonwealth Games gold medallists for Nigeria
Weightlifters at the 2022 Commonwealth Games
21st-century Nigerian women
Medallists at the 2022 Commonwealth Games